Grebin is a municipality in the district of Plön, in Schleswig-Holstein, Germany.

The districts of Behl, Breitenstein, Kakelsberg, Görnitz, Treufeld and Schönweide, which was incorporated in 1974, belong to Grebin.

References

Plön (district)